Antonín Růsek (born 22 March 1999) is a Czech footballer who currently plays as a forward for SK Sigma Olomouc.

Club career

FC Zbrojovka Brno

2016–17 season
He made his professional debut for Zbrojovka Brno in the home match against Vysočina Jihlava on 29 October 2016, which ended in a draw 1:1. He assisted in equalizing goal by Michal Škoda in the 79th minute.

Loan to Znojmo
On 26 July he joined Czech 2. Liga side 1.SC Znojmo on the one-year loan.

International career
He earned selection in September 2020, after several players dropped out of the initial squad due to the COVID-19 pandemic. He made his debut on 7 September 2020 in the home match against Scotland, which ended in a loss 1-2. The match took place in Andrův stadion in Olomouc and Růsek went on the pitch in the 80th minute. In 90th minute he hit the bar of David Marshall's goal after a fine header.

Career statistics

International

References

External links
 Profile at FC Zbrojovka Brno official site
 
 Profile at FAČR official site

1999 births
Living people
Czech footballers
Czech Republic international footballers
Czech Republic under-21 international footballers
Czech Republic youth international footballers
Czech First League players
FC Zbrojovka Brno players
Place of birth missing (living people)
Association football forwards
1. SC Znojmo players
Czech National Football League players
Footballers from Brno
SK Sigma Olomouc players